Adrien-Marie Legendre (18 September 1752 – 9 January 1833) was a French mathematician who made numerous contributions to mathematics. Well-known and important concepts such as the Legendre polynomials and Legendre transformation are named after him.

Life 
Adrien-Marie Legendre was born in Paris on 18 September 1752 to a wealthy family. He received his education at the Collège Mazarin in Paris, and defended his thesis in physics and mathematics in 1770. He taught at the École Militaire in Paris from 1775 to 1780 and at the École Normale from 1795. At the same time, he was associated with the Bureau des Longitudes. In 1782, the Berlin Academy awarded Legendre a prize for his treatise on projectiles in resistant media. This treatise also brought him to the attention of Lagrange.

The Académie des sciences made Legendre an adjoint member in 1783 and an associate in 1785. In 1789, he was elected a Fellow of the Royal Society.

He assisted with the Anglo-French Survey (1784–1790) to calculate the precise distance between the Paris Observatory and the Royal Greenwich Observatory by means of trigonometry. To this end in 1787 he visited Dover and London together with Dominique, comte de Cassini and Pierre Méchain. The three also visited William Herschel, the discoverer of the planet Uranus.

Legendre lost his private fortune in 1793 during the French Revolution. That year, he also married Marguerite-Claudine Couhin, who helped him put his affairs in order. In 1795, Legendre became one of six members of the mathematics section of the reconstituted Académie des Sciences, renamed the Institut National des Sciences et des Arts. Later, in 1803, Napoleon reorganized the Institut National, and Legendre became a member of the Geometry section. From 1799 to 1812, Legendre served as mathematics examiner for graduating artillery students at the École Militaire and from 1799 to 1815 he served as permanent mathematics examiner for the École Polytechnique. In 1824, Legendre's pension from the École Militaire was stopped because he refused to vote for the government candidate at the Institut National. His pension was partially reinstated with the change in government in 1828. In 1831, he was made an officer of the Légion d'Honneur.

Legendre died in Paris on 9 January 1833, after a long and painful illness, and Legendre's widow carefully preserved his belongings to memorialize him. Upon her death in 1856, she was buried next to her husband in the village of Auteuil, where the couple had lived, and left their last country house to the village. Legendre's name is one of the 72 names inscribed on the Eiffel Tower.

Mathematical work
Abel's work on elliptic functions was built on Legendre's, and some of Gauss' work in statistics and number theory completed that of Legendre. He developed, and first communicated to his contemporaries before Gauss, the least squares method  which has broad application in linear regression, signal processing, statistics, and curve fitting; this was published in 1806 as an appendix to his book on the paths of comets. Today, the term "least squares method" is used as a direct translation from the French "méthode des moindres carrés".

His major work is Exercices de Calcul Intégral, published in three volumes in 1811, 1817 and 1819. In the first volume he introduced the basic properties of elliptic integrals, beta functions and gamma functions, introducing the symbol Γ normalizing it to Γ(n+1) = n!. Further results on the beta and gamma functions along with their applications to mechanics – such as the rotation of the earth, and the attraction of ellipsoids – appeared in the second volume. In 1830, he gave a proof of Fermat's Last Theorem for exponent n = 5, which was also proven by Lejeune Dirichlet in 1828.

In number theory, he conjectured the quadratic reciprocity law, subsequently proved by Gauss; in connection to this, the Legendre symbol is named after him. He also did pioneering work on the distribution of primes, and on the application of analysis to number theory. His 1798 conjecture of the prime number theorem was rigorously proved by Hadamard and de la Vallée-Poussin in 1896.

Legendre did an impressive amount of work on elliptic functions, including the classification of elliptic integrals, but it took Abel's stroke of genius to study the inverses of Jacobi's functions and solve the problem completely.

He is known for the Legendre transformation, which is used to go from the Lagrangian to the Hamiltonian formulation of classical mechanics. In thermodynamics it is also used to obtain the enthalpy and the Helmholtz and Gibbs (free) energies from the internal energy. He is also the namesake of the Legendre polynomials, solutions to Legendre's differential equation, which occur frequently in physics and engineering applications, such as electrostatics.

Legendre is best known as the author of Éléments de géométrie, which was published in 1794 and was the leading elementary text on the topic for around 100 years. This text greatly rearranged and simplified many of the propositions from Euclid's Elements to create a more effective textbook.

Honors
Foreign Honorary Member of the American Academy of Arts and Sciences (1832)
The Moon crater Legendre is named after him.
Main-belt asteroid 26950 Legendre is named after him.
Legendre is one of the 72 prominent French scientists who were commemorated on plaques at the first stage of the Eiffel Tower when it first opened.

Publications

Essays
 1782 Recherches sur la trajectoire des projectiles dans les milieux résistants (prize on projectiles offered by the Berlin Academy)

Books
 Eléments de géométrie, textbook 1794
 Essai sur la Théorie des Nombres 1797-8 ("An VI"), 2nd ed. 1808, 3rd ed. in 2 vol. 1830
 Nouvelles Méthodes pour la Détermination des Orbites des Comètes, 1805
 Exercices de Calcul Intégral, book in three volumes 1811, 1817, and 1819
 Traité des Fonctions Elliptiques, book in three volumes 1825, 1826, and 1830

Memoires in Histoire de l'Académie Royale des Sciences
 1783 Sur l'attraction des Sphéroïdes homogènes (work on Legendre polynomials)
 1784 Recherches sur la figure des Planètes p. 370
 1785 Recherches d'analyse indéterminée p. 465 (work on number theory)
 1786 Mémoire sur la manière de distinguer les Maxima des Minima dans le Calcul des Variations p. 7 (as Legendre)
 1786 Mémoire sur les Intégrations par arcs d'ellipse p. 616 (as le Gendre)
 1786 Second Mémoire sur les Intégrations par arcs d'ellipse p. 644
 1787 L'intégration de quelques équations aux différences Partielles (Legendre transform)

In Memoires présentés par divers Savants à la l'Académie des Sciences de l'Institut de France
 1806 Nouvelle formula pour réduire en distances vraies les distances apparentes de la Lune au Soleil ou à une étoile (30–54)
 1807 Analyse des triangles tracés sur la surface d'un sphéroide (130–161)
 Tome 10 Recherches sur diverses sortes d'intégrales défines (416–509)
 1819 Méthode des moindres carrés pour trouver le milieu le plus probable entre les résultats de différentes observations (149–154), Mémoire sur l'attraction des ellipsoïdes homogènes (155–183)
 1823 Recherches sur quelques objets d'Analyse indéterminée et particulièrement sur le théorème de Fermat (1–60)
 1828 Mémoire sur la détermination des fonctions Y et Z que satisfont à l'équation 4(X^n-1) = (X-1)(Y^2+-nZ^2), n étant un nombre premier 4i-+1 (81–100)
 1833 Réflexions sur différentes manières de démontrer la théorie des parallèles ou le théorème sur la somme des trois angles du triangle, avec 1 planche (367–412)

Mistaken portrait
For two centuries, until the recent discovery of the error in 2005, books, paintings and articles have incorrectly shown a profile portrait of the obscure French politician Louis Legendre (1752–1797) as a portrait of the mathematician. The error arose from the fact that the sketch was labelled simply "Legendre" and appeared in a book along with contemporary mathematicians such as Lagrange. The only known portrait of Legendre, rediscovered in 2008, is found in the 1820 book Album de 73 portraits-charge aquarellés des membres de I'Institut, a book of caricatures of seventy-three members of the Institut de France in Paris by the French artist Julien-Léopold Boilly as shown below:

See also 

 List of things named after Adrien-Marie Legendre
 Associated Legendre polynomials
 Gauss–Legendre algorithm
 Legendre's constant
 Legendre's equation in number theory
 Legendre's functional relation for elliptic integrals
 Legendre's conjecture
 Legendre sieve
 Legendre symbol
 Legendre's theorem on spherical triangles
 Saccheri–Legendre theorem
 Least squares
 Least-squares spectral analysis
 Seconds pendulum

Notes

External links 

 
 The True Face of Adrien-Marie Legendre (Portrait of Legendre)
 Biography at Fermat's Last Theorem Blog
 References for Adrien-Marie Legendre
  Eléments de géométrie (Paris  : F. Didot, 1817)
 Elements of geometry and trigonometry, from the works of A. M. Legendre. Revised and adapted to the course of mathematical instruction in the United States, by Charles Davies. (New York: A. S. Barnes & co., 1858) : English translation of the above text
 Mémoires sur la méthode des moindres quarrés, et sur l'attraction des ellipsoïdes homogènes (1830)
 Théorie des nombres (Paris : Firmin-Didot, 1830)
 Traité des fonctions elliptiques et des intégrales eulériennes (Paris : Huzard-Courcier, 1825–1828)
 Nouvelles Méthodes pour la Détermination des Orbites des Comètes (Paris  : Courcier, 1806)
 Essai sur la Théorie des Nombres (Paris  : Duprat, 1798)
 Exercices de Calcul Intégral V.3 (Paris : Courcier, 1816)
 Correspondance mathématique avec Legendre in C. G. J. Jacobis gesammelte Werke (Berlin: 1852)

1752 births
1833 deaths
University of Paris alumni
18th-century French mathematicians
19th-century French mathematicians
Number theorists
Officiers of the Légion d'honneur
Fellows of the American Academy of Arts and Sciences
Members of the French Academy of Sciences
Fellows of the Royal Society
Fellows of the Royal Society of Edinburgh
Scientists from Paris